The following article is a ranked list of Hungarian counties.

By area

The following table presents a listing of Hungarian 19 counties ranked in order of their surface area.

Population

By population

The following table presents a listing of Hungarian 19 counties ranked in order of their total population (based on 2011 census). The data is taken from the Hungarian Central Statistical Office (KSH) censuses results, as well as from the Gazetteer of Hungary.

Bold: record number of the population

By population density
The following table presents a listing of Hungarian 19 counties ranked in order of their population density (based on 2011 census).

By urban and rural population
Hungarian counties by their urban and rural population as of 2015.

Health

By life expectancy
Hungarian counties by life expectancy at birth, by sex, in 2017.

Source: "6.1.7. Születéskor várható átlagos élettartam  (2001–)," National Statistics Office.

By median age
Hungarian counties by median age at birth, by sex, in 2018.

Source: "6.1.7. Átlagéletkor (2001–)," National Statistics Office.

Number of hospital beds
Hungarian counties by number of hospital beds, in 2017.

Source: "6.2.3.3. Kórházi ellátás (2000–)*," National Statistics Office.

Economy
Source: Knoema

Agriculture

By fruitage
Hungarian counties by fruitage, by tonnes, in 2016.

Source: "6.4.1.18. Gyümölcstermelés (2000–)," National Statistics Office.

Diagrams

By number and type of municipalities
Hungarian counties by their population living in urban counties (megyei jogú városok), towns (városok), large villages (nagyközségek) and villages (falvak), according to the 2017 Gazetteer of Hungary.

By largest cities
Largest cities within a county, according to the 2017 Gazetteer of Hungary (according to the number of inhabitants). In all counties, the largest city is also the county seat.

Bold: Cities with county rights

See also
Regions of Hungary
Districts of Hungary 
List of cities and towns of Hungary
Populated places of Hungary
ISO 3166-2:HU

Notes and references
Notes

References

External links

Hungarian Central Statistical Office
Gazetteer of Hungary, 2017

 
Hungary
Counties, Ranked list